Belmont Formation may refer to:
 Belmont Formation, Bermuda, a Middle Pleistocene geologic formation of Bermuda
 Belmont Formation, Grenada, an Early Miocene geologic formation of Grenada
 Belmont Conglomerate, a member of the Newcastle Coal Measures, Australia